Kerry Joyce is an interior designer, designer of houses and product designer. He directs the firm Kerry Joyce Associates, which is located in Los Angeles California. In addition to his line of furniture, lighting, rug and textile designs, Joyce's firm has worked on a wide variety of residential interior design projects.

Joyce was born in Boston, Massachusetts. He attended North Carolina School of the Arts  in Winston-Salem and earned a bachelor's degree in scenery and lighting design for the theatre from  New York University School of the Arts.  His first monograph, Kerry Joyce - The Intangible was published by Pointed Leaf Press in 2018.

Awards
 Emmy Award
 Elle Decor's A-List
 1stDib 50 Award
 Hollywood Reporter's Design Hall of Fame
 CA Home & Design - Design Master
 Elle Decor's American Design Award for Textiles

Product Design
 Kerry Joyce Atelier Furniture Collection
 Lighting Collection for Palmer Hargrave 
 Rug Collection for Mansour Modern
 Kerry Joyce Textiles

His design work has been featured in these publications:
 Architectural Digest
 Robb Report
 Elle Decor
 Forbes
 House Beautiful
 House & Garden
 Milieu Magazine
 New York Times
 Traditional Home
 Veranda
 Vogue
 World of Interiors

External links 
 Official Website
 Emmy Award
 Robb Report
 Kerry Joyce Textiles
 1stDibs 50

American interior designers
Living people
Artists from Boston
Emmy Award winners
Tisch School of the Arts alumni
University of North Carolina School of the Arts alumni
1952 births